The Calico Rock Methodist Episcopal Church is a historic former church building at 101 W. 1st in Calico Rock, Arkansas, just north of the Calico Rock Historic District.  It is a single story brick structure, built in 1923–24 with Colonial Revival and Craftsman features.  It has a front-gable roof with large Craftsman brackets and exposed rafters, with hip-roofed chancel and transept ends.  The main entrance is sheltered by a gable-roofed porch supported by brick posts.  The building served as home to a local Methodist congregation until c. 2007.

The building was listed on the National Register of Historic Places in 2007.

See also
National Register of Historic Places listings in Izard County, Arkansas

References

Methodist churches in Arkansas
Churches on the National Register of Historic Places in Arkansas
Colonial Revival architecture in Arkansas
Churches completed in 1924
Churches in Izard County, Arkansas
National Register of Historic Places in Izard County, Arkansas
1924 establishments in Arkansas